The Contessa's Secret is a 1954 French-Italian film starring Yvonne De Carlo as Virginia Oldoini, Countess of Castiglione.

Plot

Cast 
 Yvonne De Carlo as Virginia Oldoini
 Georges Marchal  as  Lucio Falengo
 Paul Meurisse  as  Napoleon III
 Rossano Brazzi  as  Count Cavour
 Lucienne Legrand as  Empress Eugénie
 Lea Padovani  as  Princess  Princess Mathilde Bonaparte
 Georges Lannes  as Mocquart
 Michel Etcheverry  as  Pietri
 Tamara Lees  as Princess of Metternich
  Claude Boissol  as  Nigra
  Lisette Lebon  as  Luisa 
 Alberto Bonucci   as  Castiglione
 Roldano Lupi   as  Orsini 
 Pierre Flourens   as  M. de Nieuwerkerke
 Charles Bouillaud   as  Un indicateur

Production
De Carlo signed on for the film in late December 1953. The film was to be shot entirely in French with no English version, which no Hollywood star had done before. It was originally called Castiglione and Raf Vallone and Georges Marchall were meant to co star.

Filming had to be brought forward earlier than planned so de Carlo could make a film with Cornel Wilde.

The film was shot in France in March 1954. De Carlo did not enjoy working for the producers . "I was very much put out when they gave me a stand in for a French dialogue coach," she said. "I thought I deserved better than that, particularly as I studied day and night to perfect myself in the reading of the lines. That was only one of numerous irksome things which not only I but other people had to put up with in that French production."

She later claimed the film was the first time a Hollywood actress did the lead in a film for which there was no English language version. "It was a distinction that made me feel proud."

See also 
 The Countess of Castiglione (1942)

References

External links

1954 films
1950s historical films
Italian historical films
French historical films
Films set in the 1850s
Films directed by Georges Combret
Cultural depictions of Napoleon III
Cultural depictions of Italian women
1950s Italian films
1950s French films